Padeški Vrh is a settlement in the Pohorje Hills north of the town of Zreče in northeastern Slovenia. The area is part of the traditional region of Styria. It is now included with the rest of the Municipality of Zreče in the Savinja Statistical Region.

References

External links
Padeški Vrh at Geopedia

Populated places in the Municipality of Zreče